Omega-7 may refer to:

 Omega 7, a Cuban paramilitary group
 Omega-7 fatty acid, a class of fatty acids